The 2016–17 Biathlon World Cup (BWC) was a multi-race tournament over a season of biathlon, organised by the International Biathlon Union. The season started on 27 November 2016 in Östersund, Sweden and ended on 19 March 2017 in Holmenkollen, Norway. The defending overall champions from the 2015–16 Biathlon World Cup were Martin Fourcade of France and Gabriela Koukalová of the Czech Republic.

Calendar
Below is the IBU World Cup calendar for the 2016–17 season.

World Cup Podiums

Men

Women

Men's team

Women's team

Mixed

Standings: Men

Overall 

Final standings after 26 races.

Individual 

Final standings after 3 races.

Sprint 

Final standings after 9 races.

Pursuit 

Final standings after 9 races.

Mass start 

Final standings after 5 races.

Relay 

Final standings after 5 races.

Nation 

Final standings after 22 races.

Standings: Women

Overall 

Final standings after 26 races.

Individual 

 Final standings after 3 races.

Sprint 

Final standings after 9 races.

Pursuit 

Final standings after 9 races.

Mass start 

Final standings after 5 races.

Relay 

Final standings after 5 races.

Nation 

Final standings after 22 races.

Standings: Mixed

Mixed relay 

Final standings after 5 races.

Medal table

Achievements
First World Cup career victory

Men
 , 25, in his 3rd season — the WC 1 Pursuit in Östersund; it also was his first podium
 , 26, in his 7th season — the World Championships Sprint in Hochfilzen; first podium was 2014-15 Sprint in Khanty-Mansiysk
 , 35, in his 15th season — the World Championships Individual in Hochfilzen; first podium was 2013-14 Sprint in Kontiolahti

Women
 , 26, in her 2nd season — the WC 3 Sprint in Nove Mesto; it also was her first podium
 , 23, in her 3rd season — the WC 3 Pursuit in Nove Mesto; first podium was 2016-17 Sprint in Nove Mesto
 , 30, in her 7th season — the WC 6 Mass Start in Antholz; it also was her first podium
 , 29, in her 10th season — the WC 9 Sprint in Oslo Holmenkollen; first podium was 2013-14 Sprint in Kontiolahti

First World Cup podium

Men
 , 28, in his 8th season — no. 3 in the WC 1 Individual in Östersund
 , 25, in his 5th season — no. 3 in the WC 5 Pursuit in Ruhpolding
 , 28, in his 8th season — no. 2 in the WC 9 Mass Start in Oslo Holmenkollen

Women
 , 28, in her 4th season — no. 3 in the WC 1 Individual in Östersund
 , 20, in her 3rd season — no. 2 in the WC 2 Sprint in Pokljuka
 , 25, in her 4th season — no. 3 in the WC 2 Pursuit in Pokljuka
 , 23, in her 3rd season — no. 2 in the WC 3 Sprint in Nove Mesto
 , 25, in her 4th season — no. 3 in the WC 6 Individual Antholtz
 , 22, in her 3rd season — no. 3 in the WC 8 Pursuit Kontiolahti

Victory in this World Cup (all-time number of victories in parentheses)

Men
 , 14 (61) first places
 , 2 (13) first place
 , 2 (12) first places
 , 2 (10) first places
 , 2 (3) first places
 , 1 (8) first place
 , 1 (1) first place
 , 1 (1) first place
 , 1 (1) first place

Women
 , 10 (17) first places
 , 5 (17) first places
 , 2 (21) first places
 , 2 (7) first places
 , 2 (4) first places
 , 2 (2) first places
 , 1 (1) first place
 , 1 (1) first place
 , 1 (1) first place

Retirements
The following notable biathletes retired during or after the 2016–17 season:

Men

 

Women

Notes

References

External links
IBU official site

 
Biathlon World Cup
2016 in biathlon
2017 in biathlon